Sir Peter Alfred Soulsby (born 27 December 1948) is a British Labour Party politician serving as Mayor of Leicester since 2011. He was the Member of Parliament (MP) for Leicester South from 2005 until he resigned his seat in April 2011, in order to contest the new post of mayor. He served as Leader of Leicester City Council from 1981 to 1994 and from 1996 to 1999.

Early life
Soulsby was born on the 27 December 1948 in Bishop Auckland and attended the Minchenden School, a grammar school in Southgate, London. He studied at the City of Leicester Training College for Teachers Scraptoft, then a constituent member of the School of Education of the University of Leicester, through which degrees were conferred. He gained a BEd. He worked as a teacher at Crown Hills Secondary Modern School and in special needs schools.

Early political career
He was first elected to Leicester City Council in 1973 and served as the Leader of the Council twice, firstly from 1981 to 1994 and secondly from 1996 to 1999. He remained a Labour councillor until he was defeated in the Spinney Hill ward in May 2003.

He unsuccessfully contested the Harborough parliamentary constituency at the 1979 general election. In 1984, he stood for election for the Leicester European Parliamentary constituency, narrowly losing to the Conservative incumbent Fred Tuckman by 1.6%.

Parliamentary career

In 2004 he was the Labour Party's candidate in the Leicester South by-election; he had been the election agent for the previous MP, Jim Marshall, and like Marshall was not always in agreement with the party's policies. Despite his anti-war stance, Soulsby lost by 5.6% to Parmjit Singh Gill of the Liberal Democrats in a by-election which was dominated by the Iraq War and the newly formed left-wing party Respect, which took 12.7% of the vote. In the 2005 general election, less than a year later, he won the seat back for Labour from Gill.

On 31 October 2006, Soulsby was one of 12 Labour MPs to back Plaid Cymru and the Scottish National Party's call for an inquiry into the Iraq War. He also rebelled against the government on its proposals to permit the detention of terrorist suspects for 90 days without trial; however, in June 2008, he supported the government on the proposal to extend the detention of terrorist suspects for 42 days. (see Terrorism Act 2006.) He retained his seat in the 2010 general election with a 5% swing from the Liberal Democrats.

In June 2010, he was selected as a Labour member of the Political and Constitutional Reform Select Committee.

On 5 March 2011, Soulsby was selected as Labour's candidate for the new post of Mayor of Leicester. He resigned as MP for Leicester South in order to contest the mayoral election. On 1 April 2011, Soulsby was appointed Crown Steward and Bailiff of the Manor of Northstead, effecting his resignation from the House of Commons.

Mayor of Leicester
Sir Peter Soulsby was elected Mayor of Leicester on 5 May 2011, with a majority of 37,260. He had previously served as Leader of Leicester City Council from 1981 to 1994 and from 1996 to 1999. In August 2011, he claimed to have delivered 99 out of 100 pledges within the first 100 days of office. He said the remaining pledge, on the future of the council offices in New Walk, would be achieved by Christmas. However he was criticised by opposition councillors for not explaining what services would be cut in future.

He has been re-elected as Mayor of Leicester twice, in 2015 and in 2019. In May 2022, he was reselected as the Labour candidate for the 2023 mayoral election.

Salary review
In November 2011, a salary of £100,000 was recommended by the Mayor's remuneration committee—a rise of £44,000, based on the fact that the mayor carried out the work of the city's former chief executive, who was paid £175,000. The council was at the time proposing cuts of £70m in services, and the recommendations were criticised by opposing councillors and trade unionists alike. The independence of the committee, which included the vice chancellor of the local university, the head of the chamber of trade and a charity sector worker, was also challenged by the only Conservative councillor "as they worked closely with Sir Peter".  The committee, whose report had been leaked, also recommended a reduction in the number of councillors and the abolition of the post of Lord Mayor. Soulsby dismissed the committee the following day, saying it had made "fundamental costing mistakes" and would have led to "totally unacceptable extra costs".

In March 2012 Soulsby's salary was set at £65,000, comparable to an MP's salary.

Bribery allegation and subsequent court case
On Thursday 5 May 2016, Mohammed Zameer Khan, a businessman, approached Sir Peter whilst he was outside a city school campaigning for the Labour Party candidate in that day's Police and Crime Commissioner election. Soulsby stated afterwards that Khan had tried to bribe him. Soulsby stated that the male patted himself down and said that he wasn't recording, then offered him ten per cent of any incentive money if Soulsby allowed him to open a bowling alley at the then disused and derelict Haymarket Theatre. Soulsby returned to his council office and wrote a report on the event, which he handed to council lawyers, who informed the police.

In court, Khan stated that he had patted himself down to apologise as he was wearing pyjamas after dropping his child off at school, denied that he said anything about not recording the discussion and stated that he had said that he would give ten per cent to charity and had not offered it as an incentive to Soulsby. Soulsby stated that charity was not mentioned at any point and described the event as "the most blatant attempt to bribe me in forty years of public life". The defendant wept in the dock as the jury acquitted him. He said that Soulsby was a celebrity and "hero type" and that he was over-awed by the encounter.

Christmas Day bus lane fine
On 25 December 2017, a man who pulled in to a bus stop on Christmas Day to help a homeless man was fined by the council. Lee Williamson said he stopped to give a homeless man a blanket, hat, gloves, scarf, food, and to chat to him. Williamson later received a £70 fine, despite no buses running on 25 December. Leicester City Council said the camera enforcement was an important safety measure. Soulsby confirmed that the penalty would not be enforced, saying, "It was quite clear what Lee was doing was an act of a good Samaritan on Christmas Day and even though it's important to keep this safe... there are exceptions."

Breach of COVID-19 restrictions
On 14 June 2020, the Leicester Mercury and The Sun newspapers published photographs appearing to show Soulsby breaking rules on movement during a lockdown by visiting his girlfriend during the COVID-19 pandemic. In response, the leader of the opposition on the Leicester City Council, Nigel Porter, and local Liberal Democrat and Conservative councillors called for Soulsby to apologise and resign his position. He rejected calls to stand aside and apologised the following day. He was quoted by the BBC as having said "It can be certainly interpreted as being against the spirit of the lockdown, if not against the regulations."

Personal life
He was knighted in 1999 New Year Honours for his services to local government.

He was married to Alison Soulsby, who died of cancer on 10 December 2011, aged 63. He has three daughters and six grandchildren from his marriage. One of his daughters is Elly Cutkelvin, a councillor for Saffron ward whom Soulsby appointed as one of his assistant mayors in 2019.

References

External links

 Man fined 'for helping homeless on Christmas Day'
 Peter Soulsby official website

 Wanting free prescriptions for university students in February 2007
 Speeding foreign drivers in January 2007

UK MPs 2005–2010
UK MPs 2010–2015
Labour Party (UK) MPs for English constituencies
1948 births
Living people
British people of English descent
Alumni of De Montfort University
Knights Bachelor
Councillors in Leicestershire
People from Bishop Auckland
English Unitarians
Mayors of places in Leicestershire
Labour Party (UK) mayors
Politicians awarded knighthoods